The Niagara Frontier Classic was a golf tournament on the LPGA Tour from 1973 to 1974. It was played at the River Oaks Country Club in Grand Island, New York.

Winners
Niagara Frontier Classic
1974 Sue Roberts

MARC Equity Classic
1973 Mary Lou Crocker

References

Former LPGA Tour events
Golf in New York (state)
History of women in New York (state)